Qovuşuq (also, Kavyshykh, Kovushuk, and Kovushut) is a village in the Lachin Rayon of Azerbaijan.

References 

Populated places in Lachin District